Anthony Quinn (April 21, 1915 – June 3, 2001) was a Mexican and American actor. The following is a filmography of his work.

Quinn starred in numerous critically acclaimed and commercially successful films, including: Zorba the Greek, Lawrence of Arabia, The Guns of Navarone, The Message, Requiem for a Heavyweight, Guns for San Sebastian, Lion of the Desert and La Strada. He won the Academy Award for Best Supporting Actor twice; for Viva Zapata! in 1952 and Lust for Life in 1956. One film starring Anthony Quinn has been listed on the National Film Registry, for preservation: Lawrence of Arabia.

In addition to theatrical films, Quinn's career also included several appearances on television programs and anthology series, as well as television films and documentaries. Quinn died of respiratory failure on June 3, 2001 at the age of 86.

Anthony Quinn also made a spoken record, with background accompaniment provided by The Harold Spina Singers: I Love You and You Love Me (7" Capitol Records CL 15649, UK 1967).

Filmography

Film

References

 General

 

 Specific

External links
 
 
 

Male actor filmographies
American filmographies
Mexican filmographies